Psidium huanucoense is a species of tree in the family Myrtaceae. It is native to Peru.

References

Trees of Peru
huanucoense